Avshen is a village in the Alagyaz Municipality of the Aragatsotn Province of Armenia.

References 

Populated places in Aragatsotn Province
Yazidi populated places in Armenia